Fritton Common, Morningthorpe is a  biological Site of Special Scientific Interest east of Long Stratton in  Norfolk.

This damp acidic meadow common is traditionally managed by light cattle grazing. Scattered ancient trees have a wide variety of epiphytic lichens, including some which are locally rare. There are a number of natural ponds with diverse invertebrate fauna.

There is access to the common from Middle Road, which runs through the site.

References

Sites of Special Scientific Interest in Norfolk